Edward Meade (also spelled "Mead") "Ned" Bagot (13 December 1822 – 28 July 1886), was a pastoralist and developer who held large properties in Central Australia.

History
Edward was born in Rockforest, Tubber, County Clare Ireland, the second son of Charles Hervey Bagot and his wife Mary, née MacCarthy. He was educated at a school run by Dr. King in Ennis, County Clare, and groomed for service with the East India Company, but was prevented by a health problem from taking a position. He emigrated to South Australia with his parents and siblings on the Birman, arriving in December 1840.

His father took up a pastoral property at Koonunga in 1841, which Ned helped manage, then in 1843 took a position as accountant and store manager at the newly opened Kapunda copper mine at Kapunda. In 1850 he was appointed a director of the South Kapunda mine.

Pastoral interests
His properties included the Murthoo Run 1846–, Ned's Corner, on the River Murray, 1854–, Kulnine, Wall Wall, "Beefacres" (now Windsor Gardens) on the River Torrens, from 1853 to 1864, Mudla Wirra (with Richard Bowen Colley) 1865–, description of Beefacres at http://nla.gov.au/nla.news-article50169874

He purchased Northern Territory lease No.1 and No.2 Undoolya Station, some 10km east of Alice Springs in 1872, then his son Ted, his stepson James Churchill-Smith (1851 – 3 October 1922), and William Gilbert (1850–1923), son of Joseph Gilbert, drove 1,000 head of cattle to Undoolya Station from Adelaide and built the first homestead.

He took out a pastoral lease on Dalhousie Springs in 1873 and built the homestead (c. 100km north of Oodnadatta), which is now in ruins. This area figured prominently in the search for Ludwig Leichhardt. Charles Todd ran the Overland Telegraph Line from Port Augusta to Macumba Well (c. 40km north of Oodnadatta), with Benjamin Babbage supervising that part of the line, which was contracted by Bagot. His son, E. M. "Ted" Bagot, died there in 1881.

He was persuaded to take up a mining lease in 1874, and set up the "Golden Reef Company", but dissolved it as soon as he found the claim worthless.

He was appointed Justice of the Peace in 1861 and resigned it in 1876. He was reappointed in 1877 after his insolvency had been settled.
(He and partner Gabriel Bennett went into voluntary liquidation in 1877; creditors were awarded 5 shillings in the pound, but Bagot refused to evade his creditors  as others had done, and by 1880 all his debts had been fully discharged, though it entailed selling most assets, including Undoolya station, on which he had just spent £30,000, at a loss staying on as manager.)

Other interests
He was a successful breeder of cattle and horses, winning many trophies. One of his horses, Don Giovanni, sired the 1873 Melbourne Cup winner, Don Juan. His thoroughbred mare Cowra won the Adelaide Cup in 1866 and 1867. Another horse, Neetlee had only one start, in 1867, when she famously threw her rider. Ned was a committee member of the S.A. Jockey Club in 1880. He was used as a test case to prove the validity of the Totalizator Repeal Act, which had the curious effect of exempting "the tote", while not a lawful instrument, from the Lotteries Act.

A section of grazing land held by Bagot and Bennett at Mile End, south of Henley Beach Road, was used by them from 1859 (or earlier) to 1869 as a racecourse (the "Thebarton Course"), notably for the South Australian Jockey Club.

His skills as a judge of livestock were regularly called for by the Show Society.

Last days
His end was a matter of newspaper speculation for nearly a week. He had gone missing after leaving a Hunt Club celebration at H. E. Downer's at Magill. He was well-known (and loved) for his eccentric dress — knee breeches, gaiters, shooting coat, and a terribly out-of-fashion broad-brimmed belltopper hat, even in the hottest weather — and there was no shortage of sightings up to North Adelaide but then the trail went cold for the hundreds of citizens and police out searching for him. Eventually he was found dead at the bottom of a Dry Creek quarry where he had presumably stumbled and fallen.

His residence on Brougham Place was purchased by George Edward Fulton.

Family
Edward Meade "Ned" Bagot (13 December 1822 – 24 July 1886) married Mary Pettman (1830 – 5 March 1855) on 1 August 1853. He married again, to the widow Anne Smith, née Walworth (1830 – 16 February 1892), on 30 July 1857. Anne had at least one child, James Churchill-Smith (1851 – 4 October 1922) by her previous marriage. Ned Bagot's family included:
Edward Meade Bagot Jr. "Ted" (17 July 1848 – 5 June 1881) was born to Mary Pettman before her marriage to Ned Bagot. Ted died at Dalhousie Springs.
James Churchill-Smith (1851 – 4 October 1922) was adopted by E. M. Bagot on his marriage to James's mother. He was educated at St. Peter's College and worked all his life for his stepfather then for Bagot Shakes & Lewis Ltd. He married Lucy or Lucie McManus (c. 1868 – 14 December 1959) on 12 January 1890.
James Churchill-Smith, MC and Bar (15 October 1894 – 15 March 1968) served as a Major in both World Wars. His diaries are an important record of World War I.
George Wallwall Bagot (2 March 1858 – 3 July 1919), often described as Ned's eldest son, married Ellen Keynes (c. 1858 – 12 January 1925) of Keyneton on 14 April 1881. He was a director of Bagot's Executor and Trustee Company, became partner in Bagot, Shakes & Lewis, land agents, with James Shakes, John Lewis (father of Essington Lewis), A. L. Harrold, W. Gilbert, H. W. Hughes, David James and George Dowling. The company absorbed Luxmoore, Dowling & Jeffrey Ltd. in 1906 then was absorbed into Goldsbrough Mort and Co. Ltd. in 1924.
George Wall Wall Bagot Hughes, MBE, (15 September 1878 – 9 December 1940). The son of Mary Ellen Hextall, he assumed the last name of Hughes after his step-father.
Richard Neetlee "Dick" Bagot (11 July 1860 – 20 January 1934) married Agnes Adeline King (c. 1860 – 4 August 1951) on 27 December 1887. Residence 7 Marlborough Street, St Peters.
Frank Neetlee Bagot ( – ) married Caroline Martha Holmes on 28 November 1918, with Elder, Smith & Co., Limited, living at Subiaco, Western Australia.
John Neetlee "Jack" Bagot (17 December 1898 – 1977) married Margaret Beatrice Fisher (1898–1987) on 11 June 1932. Margaret was a granddaughter of George Napier Birks.
Richard Neetlee Bagot (26 February 1904 – ) married Phyllis Heggaton ( – ), daughter of P. T. Heggaton
Edward Meade "Ned" Bagot (3 October 1888 - 23 September 1976) married Dorothy Edith Lane (1898-1981) on 13 December 1924 at SCEGS Chapel, North Sydney where he was a maths and physics teacher and house master for 50+ years.
William Watermit Bagot (20 August 1861 – 16 July 1862)
Charles Mulcra Bagot (9 March 1863 – 22 July 1895) married Ada Annie Westmacott, lived at Oodnadatta to 1907 then 30 Marlborough Street, College Park
Charles Ernest Bagot (twin) (26 December 1893 – 7 December 1915) died of wounds at Gallipoli.
Almerta Annie "Girlie" Bagot (twin) (26 December 1893 – ) born at Oodnadatta married E. Wilson in September 1926
George Edgar Bagot (24 April 1895 – 1987) dairy farmer of Echunga married Isabel Galbin on 9 October 1928.
Mary Bagot (25 August 1864 –) born at "Beefacres"
Lucy Cowra Bagot (18 November 1865 – 5 February 1898) born at "Beefacres", died at (which?) brother's place, Walkerville
Lille Nellnell Bagot (2 July 1867 –  1956) married sportsman and administrator Griffith Mostyn Evan (22 September 1861 – 25 December 1924) on 7 October 1891
Sophie Rose Bagot (14 February 1869 – 5 November 1889) at Brougham Place, North Adelaide
Annie Meade Bagot (31 July 1870 – 4 May 1910)
Edgar Watermeit Bagot (8 September 1872 – 13 April 1895) With Bank of New South Wales; died at Coolgardie.
Allan Walter Bagot (24 March 1874 – ) (a mourner at E. M. Bagot's funeral, and mentioned in will of John Haimes)

For some details of the extended Bagot family, see Bagot Family

References

Australian pastoralists
1822 births
1886 deaths
Irish emigrants to colonial Australia
19th-century Australian businesspeople